Jeevan Sathi is a 1962 Ollywood / Oriya film directed by Prabhat Mukherjee

Cast
 Geetanjali
 Meenati
 Sarat Pujari
 Sahu Samuel
 Srinibasa

References

1963 films
1960s Odia-language films